Francis Tregian may refer to:
Francis Tregian the Elder (1548-1608), English Catholic exile
Francis Tregian the Younger (1574-1619), his son, music copyist